The Pickett County Courthouse is a historic building in Byrdstown, Tennessee, U.S.. It serves as the courthouse for Pickett County, Tennessee.

There have been two courthouses for Pickett County. The first one, completed in 1890, burned down in 1934. The second and current one was built with Crab Orchard stone in 1935.

The building was designed in the Colonial Revival architectural style by Marr & Holman. It has been listed on the National Register of Historic Places since March 30, 1995.

References

National Register of Historic Places in Pickett County, Tennessee
Colonial Revival architecture in Tennessee
Government buildings completed in 1935
Courthouses on the National Register of Historic Places in Tennessee
County courthouses in Tennessee